The Supermarine Walrus (originally the Supermarine Seagull V) was a British single-engine amphibious biplane reconnaissance aircraft, designed by R. J. Mitchell and manufactured by Supermarine at Woolston, Southampton.

The Walrus first flew in 1933, the design effort having commenced as a private venture four years earlier. It shared its general arrangement with that of the earlier Supermarine Seagull. Having been designed to serve as a fleet spotter for catapult launching from cruisers or battleships, the aircraft was employed as a maritime patrol aircraft. The Walrus was the first British squadron-service aircraft to incorporate in one airframe a fully retractable main undercarriage, completely enclosed crew accommodation and an all-metal fuselage. Early aircraft featured the original metal hull design for its greater longevity in tropical conditions, while the later variant instead used a wooden hull to conserve the use of light alloys.

The first Seagull Vs entered service with the Royal Australian Air Force (RAAF) in 1935. The type was subsequently adopted by the Fleet Air Arm (FAA), Royal Air Force (RAF), Royal New Zealand Navy (RNZN), and Royal New Zealand Air Force (RNZAF). Walruses operated throughout the Second World War against submarines. The Walrus was adopted by the RAF Search and Rescue Force for recovering personnel from the sea. It was intended for the Walrus to be replaced by the more powerful Supermarine Sea Otter, but this was not implemented. 

Following the end of World War II, the Walrus continued to serve as a military aircraft, and some aircraft operated in a civil capacity in regions such as Australia and the Antarctic. It was largely succeeded by the first generation of rescue helicopters.

Development

Origins
The Supermarine Walrus, originally called the Supermarine Seagull V, was initially developed as a private venture in response to a Royal Australian Air Force (RAAF) requirement for an observation seaplane to be catapult-launched from cruisers. It resembled the earlier Supermarine Seagull III in general layout.

Prototype trials
During 1930, the company commenced construction of a prototype; however, as a consequence of divided attention in favour of other commitments, Supermarine did not complete this aircraft until 1933.

The prototype of the Seagull V, known as Type 228, following modifications to the design. was first flown by "Mutt" Summers on 21 June 1933. Five days later, the aeroplane (now marked N-1) made an appearance at the SBAC show at Hendon, where Summers made an unscheduled loop during the display, startled the spectators (R. J. Mitchell among them). On 29 July Supermarine handed the aircraft (re-marked as N-2) over to the Marine Aircraft Experimental Establishment at Felixstowe.  

Over the following months extensive trials took place; including shipborne trials aboard HMS Repulse and HMS Valiant carried out on behalf of the Royal Australian Navy. There were also catapult trials carried out by the Royal Aircraft Establishment at Farnborough, when the Seagull V became the first piloted aircraft in the world to be launched by catapult, piloted by Flight Lieutenant Sydney Richard Ubee.
   
The strength of the aircraft was demonstrated on 1 January 1935, when the prototype was attached to the battleship HMS Nelson at Lee-on-the-Solent. With the commander-in-chief of the Home Fleet, Admiral Roger Backhouse on board, the pilot attempted a water touch-down with the undercarriage in the down position. The Seagull V was immediately flipped over, but the occupants were saved. The machine was later repaired and returned to service. Soon afterwards it became one of the first aircraft to be fitted with an undercarriage position indicator on the instrument panel.  Test pilot Alex Henshaw later stated that the Walrus was strong enough to make a wheels-up landing on grass without much damage, but also commented that it was "the noisiest, coldest and most uncomfortable" aircraft he had ever flown.

Production

The RAAF ordered 24 examples of the Seagull V in 1933, these being delivered from 1935. Production aircraft differed from the prototype and the aircraft flown by the RAF in having Handley-Page slots fitted to the upper wings. 

The first order for 12 aircraft for the RAF was placed in May 1935; the first production aircraft, serial number K5772, flying on 16 March 1936. In RAF service the type was named Walrus and initial production aircraft were powered by the Pegasus II M2, while from 1937 the  Pegasus VI was fitted. Production aircraft differed in minor details from the prototype; the transition between the upper decking and the aircraft sides was rounded off, the three struts bracing the tailplane were reduced to two, the trailing edges of the lower wing were hinged to fold 90° upwards rather than 180° downwards, and the external oil cooler was omitted.

A total of 740 Walruses were built in three major variants: the Seagull V, Walrus I and Walrus II. The Mark IIs were constructed by Saunders-Roe  and the prototype first flew in May 1940. This variant had a wooden hull, which was heavier but economised on the use of light alloys. Saunders-Roe license-built 270 metal Mark Is and 191 wooden-hulled Mark IIs. 

The successor to the Walrus was the Sea Otter, which was similar in design but more powerful. Sea Otters never completely replaced the Walrus, and both were used for air-sea rescue during the latter part of World War II. A post-war replacement for both aircraft, the Seagull, was cancelled in 1952, with only prototypes being constructed. By that time, air-sea rescue helicopters were taking over the role from small flying-boats. 

The Walrus was known as the "Shagbat" or sometimes the "Steam-pigeon"; the latter name coming from the steam produced by water striking the Pegasus engine.

Design
The Supermarine Walrus was a single-engine amphibious biplane, principally designed to conduct maritime observation missions. The single-step hull was constructed from an aluminium alloy, with stainless steel forgings for the catapult spools and mountings. Metal construction was used because experience had shown that wooden structures deteriorated rapidly under tropical conditions. The fabric-covered wings were slightly swept back and had stainless steel spars and wooden ribs. The lower wings were set in the shoulder position with a stabilising float mounted under each. The elevators were high on the tail-fin and braced on either side by 'N' struts.

The single  Pegasus II M2 radial engine was housed at the rear of a nacelle mounted on four struts above the lower wing and braced by four shorter struts to the centre-section of the upper wing. This powered a four-bladed wooden pusher propeller. The nacelle contained the oil tank, arranged around the air intake at the front to act as an oil cooler, as well as electrical equipment, and had a number of access panels for maintenance. A supplementary oil cooler was mounted on the starboard side. Fuel was carried in two tanks in the upper wings.

The pusher configuration of the Walrus had the advantages of keeping the engine and propeller further out of the way of spray when operating on water and reducing the noise level inside the aircraft. The propeller was safely away from any crew standing on the front deck, when picking up a mooring line. The engine was offset by three degrees to starboard, to counter any tendency of the aircraft to yaw due to unequal forces on the rudder caused by the vortex from the propeller. A solid aluminium tailwheel was enclosed by a small water-rudder, which could be coupled to the main rudder for taxiing or disengaged for take-off and landing.

Although the aircraft typically flew with one pilot, there were positions for two. The main, left-hand position had a fixed seat with the instrument panel in front, while the right-hand seat could be folded away to allow access to the nose-gun position via a crawl-way. An unusual feature was that the control column was not fixed in the usual way, but could be inserted in either of two sockets in the floor. It became a habit for only one column to be in use; when control was passed between the pilots, the control column would be unplugged and handed over. Behind the cockpit, there was a small cabin with work stations for the navigator and radio operator.

Typical armament configurations for the Walrus consisted of a pair of .303 in (7.7 mm) Vickers K machine guns, one each in the open positions in the nose and rear fuselage. In addition, there were provisions for carrying either bombs or depth charges mounted beneath the lower wings.

Like other flying boats, the Walrus carried marine equipment for use on the water, including an anchor, towing and mooring cables, drogues and a boat-hook. When flying from a warship, the Walrus would be recovered by touching-down alongside, then lifted from the sea by a ship's crane. The Walrus lifting-gear was kept in a compartment in the section of wing directly above the engine. A crew member would climb onto the top wing and attach this to the crane hook. Landing and recovery was a straightforward procedure in calm waters, but could be difficult if the conditions were rough. The usual procedure was for the parent ship to turn through around 20° just before the aircraft touched down, creating a 'slick' to the lee side of ship on which the Walrus could alight, this being followed by a fast taxi up to the ship before the 'slick' dissipated.

Operational history

Initial use 

The first Seagull V, A2-1, was handed over to the Royal Australian Air Force in 1935, with the last, A2-24 being delivered in 1937.

Walrus deliveries to the RAF started in 1936 when the first example to be deployed was assigned to the New Zealand Division of the Royal Navy, on —one of the  light cruisers that carried one Walrus each.

By the start of the war, the Walrus was already in widespread use. The main task of ship-based aircraft was patrolling for Axis submarines and surface-raiders. By March 1941, Walruses were being deployed with Air-to-Surface Vessel radar systems to assist in this. During the Norwegian Campaign and the East African Campaign, Walruses saw limited use in bombing and strafing shore targets. In August 1940, a Walrus operating from HMAS Hobart bombed and machine-gunned the Italian headquarters at Zeila in British Somaliland. 

By 1943, catapult-launched aircraft on cruisers and battleships were being replaced by radar, which occupied far less space on a warship. Walruses continued to fly from Royal Navy carriers for air-sea rescue and general communications. The low landing speed of the Walrus meant they could make a carrier landing despite having no flaps or tailhook.

Air-sea rescue

The Walrus was used for air-sea rescue in the Royal Navy and the Royal Air Force. The specialist RAF Air Sea Rescue Service squadrons flew a variety of aircraft, using Spitfires and Boulton Paul Defiants to patrol for downed aircrew, Avro Ansons to drop supplies and dinghies and Walruses to pick up them up from the water. RAF air-sea rescue squadrons were deployed to cover the waters around the United Kingdom, the Mediterranean Sea and the Bay of Bengal. Over a thousand aircrew were picked up during these operations, with 277 Squadron responsible for 598 rescues.

Experimental use
In late 1939, a pair of Walruses were used at Lee-on-Solent for trials of ASV (Air to Surface Vessel) radar, the dipole aerials being mounted on the forward interplane struts. In 1940, a Walrus was fitted with a forward-firing Oerlikon 20 mm cannon, intended as a counter-measure against German E-boats. Although the Walrus proved to be a stable gun-platform, the muzzle flash rapidly blinded the pilot and the idea was not taken up.

Other users
Three Walruses N.18 (L2301), N.19 (L2302) and N.20 (L2303) were to be delivered on 3 March 1939, and used by Irish Air Corps as maritime patrol aircraft during the Irish Emergency during the war. They were scheduled to fly from Southampton to Baldonnel Aerodrome, Ireland. N.19 arrived but N.20 had to be rerouted to Milford Haven and N.18 and its crew of two (LT Higgins and LT Quinlan) were left with no choice but to go down during high seas causing damage to the hull. N.18 ditched near Ballytrent, just south of the former United States Naval Air Station, Wexford. It was decided to tow N.18, with help of the Rosslare Harbour lifeboat and a local fishing boat to the launch slip once used for the Curtiss H-16s during the First World War. It was then loaded on a truck to complete its journey to the Baldonnel Aerodrome where it was repaired. N.18 (also identified as L2301) is currently on display at the Fleet Air Arm Museum in Yeovilton, England and is one of only three surviving aircraft of the type.

A Walrus I was shipped to Arkhangelsk with other supplies brought on the British Convoy PQ 17. After sustaining damage it was repaired and supplied to the 16th air transport detachment. This sole Walrus flew to the end of 1943. After the war, some Walruses continued to see limited military use with the RAF and foreign navies. Eight were operated by Argentina, two flew from the cruiser  as late as 1958. Other aircraft were used for training by the French Navy's Aviation navale.

Civil use
Walruses also found civil and commercial use. They were briefly used by a whaling company, United Whalers. Operating in the Antarctic, they were launched from the factory ship Balaena, which had been equipped with a surplus navy aircraft catapult. The aircraft used were slightly modified; they were fitted with electrical sockets to power the electrically heated suits, worn by the crew under their immersion suits. A small, petrol-burning cabin heater was fitted to help keep the crews comfortable during flights that could last over five hours. A Dutch whaling company embarked Walruses, but never flew them. Four aircraft were bought from the RAAF by Amphibious Airways of Rabaul.  Licensed to carry up to ten passengers, they were used for charter and air ambulance work, remaining in service until 1954.

Variants

Seagull V
Original metal-hull version.
Walrus I
Metal-hull version.
Walrus II
Wooden-hull version.

Operators

Military operators

 Argentine Navy
 Argentine Naval Aviation

 Royal Australian Air Force
 No. 5 Squadron RAAF
 No. 9 Squadron RAAF
 No. 101 Flight RAAF

 Royal Canadian Air Force
 Royal Canadian Navy

 French Navy
 Aeronavale

 Irish Air Corps

 Royal New Zealand Air Force
 No. 5 Squadron RNZAF
 Seaplane Training Flight
 Royal New Zealand Navy
 HMNZS Achilles
 HMNZS Leander

 Soviet Naval Aviation

 Turkish Air Force

 Royal Navy – Fleet Air Arm
 700 Naval Air Squadron
 701 Naval Air Squadron
 702 Naval Air Squadron
 710 Naval Air Squadron
 711 Naval Air Squadron
 712 Naval Air Squadron
 714 Naval Air Squadron
 715 Naval Air Squadron
 718 Naval Air Squadron
 720 Naval Air Squadron
 737 Naval Air Squadron
 743 Naval Air Squadron
 749 Naval Air Squadron
 754 Naval Air Squadron
 764 Naval Air Squadron
 765 Naval Air Squadron
 773 Naval Air Squadron
 777 Naval Air Squadron
 779 Naval Air Squadron
 789 Naval Air Squadron
 810 Naval Air Squadron
 820 Naval Air Squadron
 1700 Naval Air Squadron
 1701 Naval Air Squadron
 Royal Air Force
 No. 89 Squadron RAF
 No. 269 Squadron RAF
 No. 275 Squadron RAF
 No. 276 Squadron RAF
 No. 277 Squadron RAF
 No. 278 Squadron RAF
 No. 281 Squadron RAF
 No. 282 Squadron RAF
 No. 283 Squadron RAF
 No. 284 Squadron RAF
 No. 292 Squadron RAF
 No. 293 Squadron RAF
 No. 294 Squadron RAF
 No. 624 Squadron RAF

Civilian operators

 Amphibious Airways

 Kenting Aviation

 Two aircraft were embarked on board of whaling ship Willem Barentsz

 Vestlandske Luftfartsselskap

 Somerton Airways
 United Whalers

Surviving aircraft
Three examples survive in museums in addition to one that is privately owned.

Wreckage that is thought to be that of the Walrus assigned to the cruiser HMAS Sydney was photographed when the wreck of the vessel was rediscovered in 2008.

Seagull V A2-4

One of the original Australian aircraft, A2-4 is on permanent display at the Royal Air Force Museum London. Built at Woolston in 1934, it arrived in Australia in early 1936 where it was initially allocated to No. 101 Flight RAAF, which shortly afterwards became No. 5 Squadron RAAF. Before the war, it had various duties, which included survey work and flying from HMAS Sydney. It served for most of the war with No. 9 Squadron RAAF in Australia.

In 1946, it was sold to civilian owners and in 1951 was allocated the civil registration VH–ALB. During the 1950s and 60s, it was flown by several Australian private owners before being badly damaged in a take-off accident in 1970 at Taree, New South Wales. The vandalised, derelict wreck was subsequently acquired from its owner by the RAF Museum, in exchange for a Supermarine Spitfire and a cash payment of Australian $5,000. 

In 1973, it was flown back to the United Kingdom by an RAF Short Belfast via the Pacific and the United States, although the aircraft had to be fumigated in Hawaii due to the discovery of Black widow spiders. Restoration immediately began after its arrival at the RAF Museum store at RAF Henlow and it has been on display at the museum's London site (Hendon) since 1979.

Walrus HD874
This aircraft is on display at the Royal Australian Air Force Museum. It was originally flown by the Fleet Air Arm, before being transferred to the Royal Australian Air Force in 1943. During the war, HD874 was flown by the RAAF's No. 9 Squadron and No. 8 Communication Unit. 

Post-war, it was placed in storage until 1947, when it was issued to the RAAF's Antarctic flight, for use on Heard Island. The Antarctic Flight only flew it once before it was badly damaged by a storm. It was recovered in 1980, and restored between 1993 and 2002.

Walrus L2301

The Walrus displayed at the Fleet Air Arm Museum at RNAS Yeovilton is a composite aircraft, constructed using the fuselage and engine of Walrus L2301. Built in 1939, this aircraft never flew in British military service. It was delivered to the Irish Air Corps, which flew it during World War 2, when it carried the Irish designation N.18. During its delivery flight, on 3 March 1939, it suffered engine failure and later hull damage from ditching in the high seas. The aircraft was towed to the former launch strip for the Curtiss H-16s at the United States Naval Air Station, Ireland. 

On 9 January 1942 N.18 was stolen by four Irish nationals who intended to fly to France to join the Luftwaffe. However, they were intercepted by RAF Spitfires and escorted to RAF St Eval; the aircraft and its occupants were returned to Ireland. 

After the war, it was transferred to Aer Lingus and given the Irish civil registration EI-ACC. It was given the British civilian registration G-AIZG and flown until 1949 by members of No. 615 Squadron RAF for recreation. In 1963, it was recovered from a dump at Haddenham airfield (formerly RAF Thame) by Fleet Air Arm crew from HMS Heron. They presented it to the Fleet Air Arm Museum who restored it between 1964 and 1966, it has been an exhibit at the Fleet Air Museum since then.

Walrus W2718 (G-WLRS)
After wartime RAF service, this aircraft was operated by Somerton Airways on the Isle of Wight until it was decommissioned in 1947. It was subsequently used as a caravan.

It became part of the collection of Solent Sky, an air museum in Southampton. The museum began restoring the aircraft to flying condition. Later, the project was sold to James Lyle and the restoration work was restarted in 2011 at Vintage Fabrics, Audley End, Essex with the civil registration G-RNLI.

In 2018, the aircraft was sold to another private owner, and was moved to the Aircraft Restoration Company at Duxford Aerodrome, who continued work on its restoration. At this time the aircraft was reregistered as G-WLRS.

Specifications (Supermarine Walrus I)

See also

Notes

References

Sources

Further reading

External links

 Flying the Superamrine Walrus by Flt Lt Nick Berryman (self-published)
 A 2013 picture of the privately owned Walrus, G/RNLI.
 Fleet Air Arm Archive
 The Walrus in action from British Movietone
 Information about the Supermarine Seagull V from the Royal Australian Navy website

1930s British military reconnaissance aircraft
Amphibious aircraft
Biplanes
Single-engined pusher aircraft
Walrus
Carrier-based aircraft
Aircraft first flown in 1933